The 2010 Nürburgring Superleague Formula round was a Superleague Formula round  held on June 27, 2010, at the Nürburgring circuit, Nürburg, Germany. It was the first time since 2008 that Superleague Formula visited the Nürburgring circuit. It was the fifth round of the 2010 Superleague Formula season.

Eighteen clubs took part, although none from Germany. It was the first time that a Superleague Formula round did not feature a club from that country. In 2008, German club Borussia Dortmund took part in the Nürburgring round.

Support races included the Radical Masters.

Report

Qualifying

Race 1

Race 2

Super Final

Results

Qualifying
 In each group, the top four qualify for the quarter-finals.

Group A

Group B

Knockout stages

Grid

Race 1

Race 2

Super Final

Standings after the round

References

External links
 Official results from the Superleague Formula website

Nurburgring
Superleague Formula
Sport in Rhineland-Palatinate